Krasny Ruchey is a rural locality (a village) in Ilyinskoye Rural Settlement, Kolchuginsky District, Vladimir Oblast, Russia. The population was 1 as of 2010. There are 4 streets.

Geography 
Krasny Ruchey is located 10 km west from Bolshevik, 17 km north of Kolchugino (the district's administrative centre) by road. Obukhovo is the nearest rural locality.

References 

Rural localities in Kolchuginsky District